Feliks Chmurkowski (18 May 1896 – 16 April 1971) was a Polish film actor. He appeared in more than 30 films between 1933 and 1971.

Selected filmography
 His Excellency, The Shop Assistant (1933)
 Każdemu wolno kochać (1933)
 Police Chief Antek (1935)
 Jaśnie pan szofer (1935)
 Wacuś (1935)
 Bolek i Lolek (1936)
 Bohaterowie Sybiru (1936)
 The Three Hearts (1939)

References

External links

1896 births
1971 deaths
Polish male film actors
Male actors from Warsaw
People from Warsaw Governorate
Polish male stage actors